Taminiaux is a surname. Notable people with the surname include:

Jacques Taminiaux (1928–2019), Belgian philosopher and professor
Lionel Taminiaux (born 1996), Belgian road cyclist
Willy Taminiaux (1939–2018), Belgian politician and mayor

Surnames of Belgian origin